Mio Narita (born 18 December 2006) is a Japanese competitive swimmer. She is the 2022 World Junior champion and 2022 Junior Pan Pacific champion in both the 200-metre individual medley and the 400-metre individual medley. She is a former world junior record holder in the 400-metre individual medley.

Career

2022
On 3 March 2022, at the selection meet for swimmers to represent Japan at the 2022 World Aquatics Championships, Narita set a new world junior record in the 400-metre individual medley with a time of 4:36.71, which followed the record of 4:38.53 established in 2019 by Alba Vázquez of Spain, and did not qualify for the senior World Championships.

2022 Junior Pan Pacific Championships
At the 2022 Junior Pan Pacific Swimming Championships, held at Veterans Memorial Aquatic Center in Honolulu, United States, Narita won the gold medal in the 400-metre individual medley with a Championships record time of 4:36.79, finishing over six seconds ahead of silver medalist Kayla Han of the United States. She also won the gold medal in the 200-metre individual medley, with a time of 2:11.22, and the silver medal in the 200-metre backstroke, with a time of 2:09.67. Based upon point allocations for each placing by athletes in their individual events at the Championships, Narita ranked as the second highest scoring female competitor, behind American Erin Gemmell, and fourth highest scoring overall competitor, behind Erin Gemmell and Australian male swimmers Joshua Staples and Flynn Southam.

2022 World Junior Championships

Starting competition on day one at the 2022 FINA World Junior Swimming Championships, held in Lima, Peru starting three days after the end of the Junior Pan Pacific Championships, Narita ranked first in the preliminaries of the 400-metre individual medley with a 4:45.29 and qualified for the final. She maintained a leading edge of approximately 14 seconds in the final, which corresponded to sixth-place finisher Vivien Jackl of Hungary, achieving a new Championship record time of 4:37.78 and winning the gold medal. Two days later, she ranked second in the preliminaries of the 200-metre backstroke, only behind Dóra Molnár of Hungary, with a time of 2:12.05, and advanced to the final. For her performance in the final, she finished 0.01 seconds behind bronze medalist Laura Bernat of Poland with a 2:11.10 to place fourth.

The next day, Narita ranked first in the preliminaries of the 200-metre individual medley with a 2:14.74, which was 9.00 seconds faster than eighth-rank and last final qualifier Jimena Leguizamón of Colombia. In the final later the same day, she won the gold medal with a time of 2:11.68, finishing 2.06 seconds ahead of bronze medalist Emma Carrasco of Spain. Two days later, she split a 1:11.68 for the breaststroke leg of the 4×100-metre medley relay in the preliminaries, helping qualify the relay to the final ranking second with a time of 4:10.41. On the finals relay, she switched strokes, splitting a 56.17 for the freestyle leg of the relay to help win the gold medal in a time of 4:06.44.

Later in the year, in December at the 2022 Japan Open Swimming Championships in Tokyo, Narita won the gold medal in the 400-metre individual medley with a time of 4:37.32. On 3 December, the following day, she won the gold medal in the 200-metre individual medley with a time of 2:12.23.

2023
In January 2023, Narita competed at the 2023 South Australia State Open Championships in Adelaide, Australia, winning the 200-metre backstroke with a 2:13.59 and the 200-metre individual medley with a 2:14.34. The following month, she won the 400-metre individual medley at the 2023 Konami Open in Chiba Prefecture, finishing in a meet record time of 4:37.59.

International championships

Personal best times

Long course metres (50 m pool)

Records

World junior records

Long course metres (50 m pool)

References

External links
 

2006 births
Living people
People from Katsushika
Sportspeople from Tokyo
Japanese female medley swimmers
Japanese female backstroke swimmers
21st-century Japanese women